Khargram is a village, with a police station, in the Khargram CD block in the Kandi subdivision of Murshidabad district in the state of West Bengal, India.

Geography

Location

Area overview
The entire area is overwhelmingly rural with over 80% of the population living in the rural areas.

Note: The map alongside presents some of the notable locations in the subdivisions. All places marked in the map are linked in the larger full screen map.

Demographics
According to the 2011 Census of India, Khargram had a total population of 11,209, of which 5,705 (51%) were males and 5,504 (49%) were females. Population in the age range 0-6 years was 1,308. The total number of literate persons in Khargram was 5,976 (60.36% of the population over 6 years).

Civic administration

Police station
Khargram police station has jurisdiction over Khargram CD Block.

Transport
State Highway 7 running from Rajgram (in Birbhum district) to Midnapore (in Paschim Medinipur district) passes through Khargram.

Healthcare
Khargram Rural Hospital, with 50 beds, is a major government medical facility in Kahragram CD block.

See also - Healthcare in West Bengal

References

Villages in Murshidabad district